Same-sex marriage in Colombia has been legal since 28 April 2016 in accordance with a 6–3 ruling from the Constitutional Court of Colombia that banning same-sex marriage is unconstitutional under the Constitution of Colombia. The decision took effect immediately, and made Colombia the fourth country in South America to legalize same-sex marriage, after Argentina, Brazil and Uruguay. The first same-sex marriage was performed in Cali on 24 May 2016. Colombia has also recognised same-sex de facto unions, providing some of the rights and benefits of marriage, since 2007.

De facto unions
A de facto union can be registered through a public deed with a notary or a judge. A registered union may provide greater convenience when accessing rights. If unregistered, a person may have to prove the union's existence to a court.

On 7 February 2007, the Constitutional Court of Colombia extended several property and pension rights to same-sex couples. A subsequent court decision, handed down in October 2007, extended social security and health insurance rights to same-sex couples. On 28 January 2009, the Constitutional Court gave 42 more rights to cohabitating same-sex couples that were previously only granted to heterosexual couples (including citizenship rights, residence permits, testimony when in jury, family-properties laws, etc.). Another ruling that was handed down on 13 April 2011 extended inheritance rights to same-sex couples. In a ruling issued on 4 January 2021, the court ruled that a couple who wishes to prove that they live in a de facto union must provide information on the date since they have lived together, social events they attended together, mutual support during difficult times, or joint projects.

Statistics
From February 2007 to August 2012, at least 51 same-sex de facto unions were registered by notaries in the coastal city of Cartagena. During that same time period, 74 and 140 such unions were registered in the cities of Soledad and Bogotá, respectively.

Civil union proposals
On 15 June 2007, the Chamber of Representatives approved a historic same-sex union bill by a vote of 62–43, and President Álvaro Uribe was expected to sign the measure into law, which had been approved by the Colombian Senate in April. However, on 19 June, a group of conservative senators broke party discipline in what is usually a routine vote on the final form of a bill and defeated the measure by 29–34 in the 102-member Senate. About 80 LGBT advocates held a demonstration outside the Capitolio Nacional the following day, protesting the bill's defeat. Supporters vowed to revive the legislation.

The bill, which had been endorsed by conservative President Uribe, would have made Colombia the first nation in Latin America to grant same-sex couples in long-term relationships the same rights to health insurance, inheritance and social security as married couples.

On 17 March 2015, Senator Armando Benedetti introduced a civil union bill. The bill was not voted on, and it was re-introduced by Senator Roy Barreras on 30 July 2015. On the same day, senators Benedetti and Barreras introduced a bill allowing same-sex couples to adopt children, but likewise the measure was not voted on.

Same-sex marriage

Legislative proposals
On 26 July 2011, the Constitutional Court ruled unanimously 9–0 (in case C-577/2011) that, although it could not change the definition of marriage as "the union of a man and a woman", same-sex couples have the right to form a family. The court ordered the Congress of Colombia to pass legislation addressing this issue, whether by legalizing same-sex marriage or another marriage-like union, within two years (by 20 June 2013). If such a law were not passed by that deadline, the court ruled that same-sex couples would automatically become able to register their relationship with a notary. In 2011, four bills were announced in Congress to recognize same-sex couples; two used the word "marriage", and the other two would have created civil unions.

In October 2012, Senator Armando Benedetti introduced a bill legalizing same-sex marriage. The bill initially only allowed for civil unions, but the text was later changed by Benedetti to permit same-sex couples to marry. President Juan Manuel Santos did not take a position on the bill. The Senate's First Committee approved the bill on 4 December 2012. On 24 April 2013, it was rejected by the Senate in a 17–51 vote, after being postponed on two different occasions. The negative outcome was expected, as the two biggest parties made a commitment to kill the bill. Senator Benedetti responded to the vote calling the Colombian Congress "worthless", and stating that senators who voted against the project wanted the Congress to be like the ones of "Congo, Uganda, Bolivia and Haiti".

Days before the vote, the superintendent of the Superintendence of Notaries and Registrations of Colombia, Jorge Enrique Vélez, announced that if the Congress failed to pass the same-sex marriage bill before the 20 June deadline, the Ministry of Justice and Law, led by Minister Ruth Stella Correa Palacio, would prepare guidelines for notaries and judges to conduct "solemn contracts" for same-sex couples. On 18 April 2013, the Superintendence presented its own proposal, which sought to set guidelines for the celebration of same-sex couples' "marital unions". On 20 June, notaries across the country started performing these unions; however, LGBT activists advised couples not to enter into those contracts because, they said, the framework for a "marital contract" did not exist in Colombian law. In the following days, several couples made petitions to judges to have their relationships recognized as a marriage.

On 24 July 2013, a judge in Bogotá declared a male same-sex couple legally married, after a ruling on 11 July accepting the petition. This was the first same-sex couple married in Colombia. In September 2013, two judges married two other same-sex couples. The first marriage was challenged by a conservative group, and it was initially annulled. However, in October, the Bogotá High Court maintained the validity of that marriage. The issue of same-sex marriage was once again discussed by the Constitutional Court after the Office of the Inspector General requested that the court invalidate all the marriages. A hearing was scheduled for 7 May 2015. It was postponed as some judges were not present and a new hearing open to the public occurred on 30 July 2015. A verdict was to be reached before 31 August 2015.

On 30 July 2015, Senator Benedetti introduced a same-sex marriage bill. The Senate's First Committee started to debate the bill on 9 December 2015, but it was not voted on by Congress.

Recognition of marriages performed abroad
In May 2015, Interior Minister Juan Fernando Cristo announced the government's support for a move to recognise same-sex marriage. He made the statement the day after a multi-country same-sex couple began an unprecedented legal battle to have their 2013 marriage performed in Spain recognised in Colombia.

Colombian government agencies began recognising same-sex marriages lawfully performed in foreign jurisdictions in March 2016. Same-sex couples married abroad are now entitled to the same visa, health care benefits, inheritance and pension rights as heterosexual spouses once they take a stamped marriage certificate and identification papers to the nearest designated office.

2016 Constitutional Court ruling
In March 2016, a draft of a ruling, considered to be a minority opinion of the Constitutional Court, was published by Judge Jorge Ignacio Pretelt. The draft argued that marriage applied only to one man and one woman and that it was up to Congress to legalize same-sex marriage, and thus not a matter for the courts to decide. On 7 April 2016, the court voted 6–3 against the proposal. Judge Alberto Rojas Río was assigned to prepare a new proposal, which was expected to be in line with the court majority's view (i.e. to declare that prohibiting same-sex couples from getting married is unconstitutional). The court announced its decision on 28 April 2016, ruling by a 6–3 margin that "marriage between people of the same sex does not violate the constitutional order". The ruling established that every "solemn contract" entered into by same-sex couples since 20 June 2013 (under the provisions of the court's previous ruling in the C-577/2011 case) is legally valid and to be recognised as a marriage, meaning that couples who have entered into such unions since 20 June 2013 need not remarry as a result of the court's new ruling. The ruling was officially published on 7 July 2016.

Judge Maria Victoria Calle Correa wrote, "all people are free to choose independently to start a family in keeping with their sexual orientation... receiving equal treatment under the constitution and the law." The court's ruling informed state judges, notaries and clerks that they "must ensure that citizens' fundamental rights are observed and that they are all granted equal treatment." The first same-sex wedding following the ruling occurred in Cali on 24 May 2016 between Fernando Fernando Quimbayo and José Manuel Ticora.

On 12 July 2016, the Constitutional Court rejected a challenge filed by a conservative group to nullify the ruling. In January 2017, the court rejected an appeal filed by former Inspector General Alejandro Ordóñez to overturn the decision.

Statistics and notable weddings
In Colombia, civil marriages are performed by notaries and judges. Every marriage performed in Colombia has to be registered with the National Civil Registry.

According to the Superintendence of Notaries and Registrations, notaries performed 138 same-sex marriages in 2016, 341 in 2017 and 316 in 2018, with most occurring in Antioquia, Cundinamarca (including Bogotá), Valle del Cauca and Risaralda departments. By June 2019, 968 same-sex marriages had been performed by notaries in Colombia since legalization; 258 in Bogotá, 240 in Medellín, 92 in Cali, and 79 in Pereira. Six same-sex divorces occurred in 2017 and five in 2018. 1,703 same-sex marriages were performed in Colombia between 2016 and 2021, representing about 0.5% of all marriages.

In December 2019, Mayor Claudia López Hernández of Bogotá married her partner Angélica Lozano Correa, in one of the more notable same-sex marriages in Colombia.

Public opinion
A poll conducted between December 2009 and January 2010 in Bogotá showed that 63% of the city's population was in favor of legalizing same-sex marriage, while 36% was against it. The poll showed that women and people with a higher education level were more likely to support same-sex marriage.

A nationwide Ipsos poll conducted in November 2012 found that 28% of Colombians supported same-sex marriage, while 66% opposed it and 6% did not respond. According to a Pew Research Center survey conducted between 28 November 2013 and 4 March 2014, 28% of Colombians supported same-sex marriage, while 64% were opposed.

A Gallup poll conducted in July 2016 showed that 40% of Colombians supported same-sex marriage, while 57% were opposed. The 2017 AmericasBarometer showed that 34% of Colombians supported same-sex marriage. A 2018 Gallup poll found that support for same-sex marriage had increased to 46%, with 52% of Colombians opposed.

In October 2019, an Invamer poll showed that support for same-sex marriage had, for the first time ever, reached 50%, with 47% opposing. 36% of respondents supported adoption by same-sex couples, while 62% opposed.

See also 
 LGBT rights in Colombia
 Recognition of same-sex unions in the Americas

References

External links 
 

LGBT rights in Colombia
Colombia
2016 in LGBT history